Gábor Korolovszky (born 11 July 1979 ) is a Hungarian defender who current is free agent. He played in many teams like MTK Hungária FC, Real Madrid, CD Toledo, Ujpest FC, AC Omonia and Apollon Limassol.

External links
 

1979 births
Living people
Footballers from Budapest
Hungarian footballers
Association football defenders
Hungary international footballers
Hungary under-21 international footballers
MTK Budapest FC players
BKV Előre SC footballers
Real Madrid Castilla footballers
CD Toledo players
Újpest FC players
AC Omonia players
Apollon Limassol FC players
Aris Limassol FC players
Szombathelyi Haladás footballers
Cypriot First Division players
Hungarian expatriate footballers
Expatriate footballers in Spain
Expatriate footballers in Cyprus
Hungarian expatriate sportspeople in Spain
Hungarian expatriate sportspeople in Cyprus
Association football midfielders

Segunda División players